This is a list of episodes for Intervention, an American reality television program which aired on the A&E Network since 2005. 

Each episode follows one or two participants, each of whom has an addiction or other mentally and/or physically damaging problem and believes that they are being filmed for a documentary on their problem. Their situations are actually being documented in anticipation of an intervention by family and/or friends. Episodes typically feature an epilogue or follow-up months later with an update to the addicted person's progress or state.

As of January 13, 2017, the series consisted of a total of 265 episodes and 10 specials. Most episodes are available individually on DVD from A&E's website.

Series overview

Episodes

Season 1 (2005)

Season 2 (2005–06)

Season 3 (2007)

Season 4 (2007–08)

Season 5 (2008)

Season 6 (2008–09)

Season 7 (2009)

Season 8 (2009–10)

Season 9 (2010)

Season 10 (2010–11)

Season 11 (2011)

Season 12 (2012)

Season 13 (2012–13)

Season 14 (2013–14)

Season 15 (2015)

Season 16 (2016–17)

Season 17 (2017)

Season 18 (2018)

Season 19 (2018–19)

Season 20 (2019)

Season 21 (2020)

Season 22 (2021)

Season 23 (2021)

Season 24 (2022)

References

External links
 
 
 

Lists of American non-fiction television series episodes